Gryfino  is a town in Pomerania, northwestern Poland, with 21,393 inhabitants (2017). It is also the capital of Gryfino County in West Pomeranian Voivodeship (since 1999), previously in Szczecin Voivodeship (1975–1998). 

There is a direct road link between Gryfino and the German town of Mescherin across the river.

The Crooked Forest is located in the village of Nowe Czarnowo, just outside Gryfino.

History
The settlement, then German, was originally called Greifenhagen. It was built in 1230, and was raised to the rank of a town and fortified about 1250. In the Thirty Years' War it was taken both by the Holy Roman Empire and the Swedish Empire, and in 1675 it was captured by the Brandenburgers, into whose possession it came finally in 1679.

In 1945, the town and its region became Polish and was renamed Gryfino from the original Greifenhagen by replacing the German suffix -hagen by the Polish suffix -ino.

Demographics

International relations

Gryfino is twinned with:
 Barlinek, Poland
 Bersenbrück, Germany
 Gartz, Germany
 Raciechowice, Poland
 Schwedt, Germany

Towns near Gryfino
Szczecin (Poland)
Stargard (Poland)
Cedynia (Poland)
Chojna (Poland)
Mieszkowice (Poland)
Moryń (Poland)
Trzcińsko-Zdrój (Poland)
Myślibórz (Poland)
Pyrzyce (Poland)
Schwedt (Germany)
Vierraden (Germany)
Gartz (Germany)
Penkun (Germany)

Gallery

Notable people 
 Michał Bieniek (born 1984 in Gryfino) a former Polish athlete who specialized in the high jump. He competed at the 2008 Summer Olympics

See also
Crooked Forest, a nearby forest

References

External links

Jewish Community in Gryfino on Virtual Shtetl

Cities and towns in West Pomeranian Voivodeship
Gryfino County
Germany–Poland border crossings